Wolmirstedt station is a railway station in the municipality of Wolmirstedt, located in the Börde district in Saxony-Anhalt, Germany.

References

Railway stations in Saxony-Anhalt
Buildings and structures in Börde (district)